V. S. Ugrappa is an Indian politician and former member of parliament from Bellary constituency in Karnataka. He lost in the 2019 Indian general election to Devendrappa. A member of the Indian National Congress, he was elected in a bypoll in November 2018. He defeated the Bharatiya Janata Party candidate J. Shantha by 2.1 lakh votes.

He was born in Venkatapura of Pavagada taluk.

Ugrappa was previously a member of the Karnataka Legislative Council.

References 

Living people
Kannada people
India MPs 2014–2019
Lok Sabha members from Karnataka
Indian National Congress politicians from Karnataka
Members of the Karnataka Legislative Council
1954 births